John Chipman Wade (1817 – July 9, 1892) was a Canadian politician and lawyer who served in both the Nova Scotia House of Assembly and the House of Commons of Canada.

The son of John Wade and Harriet Chipman, Wade was born in Granville, Nova Scotia and educated at Annapolis Royal. He was called to the Nova Scotia bar in 1840. In 1842, Wade married Caroline Viets, the daughter of the Reverend Roger Viets. He represented Digby County in the provincial assembly from 1851 to 1867 and served as speaker for the assembly from 1864 to 1867. Wade supported Confederation which led to his defeat when he ran for reelection to the provincial assembly in 1867. He was named Queen's Counsel in 1867. Wade was elected as a Member of the historical Conservative Party in 1878 to the House of Commons in the riding of Digby in a by-election and re-elected in 1878.  He was defeated in the election of 1882.

References 

1817 births
1892 deaths
Conservative Party of Canada (1867–1942) MPs
Members of the House of Commons of Canada from Nova Scotia
Nova Scotia pre-Confederation MLAs
Speakers of the Nova Scotia House of Assembly
Canadian King's Counsel